Dark Roots of Thrash is a double-disc live album and DVD by American thrash metal band Testament, released on October 15, 2013 through Nuclear Blast. The performance was recorded at The Paramount Theatre in Huntington, New York on February 15, 2013. It was released on October 22, 2013 in Europe and on October 29, 2013 in the United States.

Track listing
CD track listing

DVD Extras
Backstage Footage
"Native Blood" (Video Clip)

Personnel
Testament
Chuck Billy – vocals
Alex Skolnick – guitar
Eric Peterson – guitar
Greg Christian – bass
Gene Hoglan – drums

Additional personnel
Tommy Jones – director
Juan Urteaga – mixing
Steve Lagudi – recording
Get Hammered Productions – production

Charts

References

2013 live albums
Testament (band) live albums
2013 video albums
Live video albums
Testament (band) video albums
Nuclear Blast albums